Catherine Cruz Gonzaga-Morada (born January 16, 1988), professionally known as Alex Gonzaga, is a Filipino media personality, host, comedienne, actress, businesswoman, and singer.

Early life
Alex Gonzaga was born Catherine Cruz Gonzaga on January 16, 1988, in Taytay, a first-class densely populated municipality of Rizal, to Crisanta "Pinty" (née Cruz) Gonzaga and then-incumbent Vice-Mayor Carlito "Bonoy" Gonzaga. Her elder sister is TV host and actress Toni Gonzaga.

Alex graduated Bachelor of Science in Child Development and Education from the University of Asia and the Pacific.

Personal life
In November 2016, Gonzaga began dating Lipa City councilor Michael "Mikee" Morada. On January 16, 2020, Gonzaga announced on Instagram that she and Morada were engaged. On January 17, 2021, Gonzaga announced on her YouTube channel that she and Morada have been married in a private wedding at the Gonzaga residence in Taytay since November 2020.

In a vlog uploaded to her YouTube channel on October 24, 2020, Gonzaga and her family were tested positive for COVID-19, and she shared how they recovered from the virus.

In 2021, Gonzaga was pregnant with her first child, until she suffered a miscarriage.

Career

2006–2012: Early works
Gonzaga started her career on ABS-CBN for the sitcom, Let's Go, where she played the role of Alex, which also became her personal nickname. Her role lasted until the series' fourth season called Gokada Go!. After her departure from the sitcom, she was cast in different dramas on the same network, such as Pangarap Na Bituin, Your Song and My Girl.

In 2008, Gonzaga transferred to TV5 and became one of the hosts for the talk show, Juicy!. She played a lead role in the 2011 soap opera Babaeng Hampaslupa. Further roles on the network include BFGF, P.S. I Love You and Enchanted Garden.

2013–2019: Breakthrough
Gonzaga returned to ABS-CBN in April 2013. She was a co-host for the Philippine version of The Voice. She also served as a guest host for the Philippine version of Big Brother on its All In season. During the pilot episode of PBB: All In, Gonzaga was revealed to be the third and final celebrity housemate to enter the Pinoy Big Brother house, following collegiate athlete Michele Gumabao and actress Jane Oineza. She was given the title as "Sassy Sister ng Rizal". During a diary room session with Big Brother, Gonzaga turns out to be actually a celebrity houseguest and was tasked to avoid revealing the information to the other official housemates. After staying in the Big Brother house for two months, she returned to the "outside world" on June 14, 2014, and she was replaced by internet sensation Cheridel Alejandrino, also known as "Elevator Girl". Gonzaga went on to play her most major role as the lead character Diane Santos in the hit drama series Pure Love, a Philippine adaptation of Korean drama 49 Days, co-starring Yen Santos. Pure Love aired from July to November 2014.

She was also part of the comedy gag show Banana Split, and also starred on the drama anthology Maalaala Mo Kaya for two episodes. She then released her novel book Dear Alex, Break na Kami. Paano? Love Catherine (2014), under ABS-CBN Publishing, Inc. The novel received positive reviews from fans and critics alike, most complimenting the novel's "break-up" concept and enjoyed its humor. A film adaption for the novel was reported to be in the works, with Gonzaga sharing interest in casting Luis Manzano, John Lloyd Cruz and Piolo Pascual for the film adaption.

She was also cast on her first film under Star Cinema, The Amazing Praybeyt Benjamin (2014), one of the official entries to the 40th Metro Manila Film Festival. The film was commercially successful and achieved the milestones for having the highest-gross on opening day of any local film and the title of being one of the highest-grossing local film of all time in the Philippines. The film received mixed to negative reviews from critics. Zig Marasigan from Rappler described the film in his movie review as "a brainless, hyper-stylized and utterly ridiculous family comedy."

Gonzaga released her debut studio album I Am Alex G. (2015) with the studio album's lead hit single, "Panaginip Lang", under Star Music. The studio album had a grand launch at Eastwood Central Plaza on March 22, 2015, and a concert, AG from the East: The Unexpected Concert, which was later on held at the Araneta Coliseum to support her studio album on April 25, 2015. She had another major project as the lead star of fantasy series Inday Bote, a TV adaptation of the classic Filipino film of the same title. She also took hosting duties in the original, local dance competition show Dance Kids, alongside Robi Domingo.

2020–present: Return to TV5 during the COVID-19 pandemic
After the shutdown of ABS-CBN and the denial of its franchise renewal plotted by President Rodrigo Duterte, Solicitor General Jose Calida, the National Telecommunications Commission (NTC), and the Philippine House Committee of 18th Congress, Gonzaga has returned to TV5 for a blocktime agreement with Brightlight Productions, and is currently one of the main hosts of noontime variety show Lunch Out Loud, premiered on October 19, 2020.

Filmography

Film

Television

Music videos

Discography

Extended plays

Singles

Chart performance

Concerts
AG from the East: The Unexpected Concert (2015)

Written works
Dear Alex, Break na Kami. Paano? Love Catherine (2014)
Dear Alex, We're Dating. Tama, Mali?! Love Catherine (2016)
 Sissums (2018)

Awards and nominations

References

External links
 Alex Gonzaga Official on YouTube
 Alex Gonzaga-Morada on Twitter
 

1988 births
21st-century Filipino singers
21st-century Filipino women singers
ABS-CBN personalities
Actresses from Rizal
Filipino film actresses
Filipino Internet celebrities
Filipino television actresses
Filipino television variety show hosts
Filipino women comedians
Filipino YouTubers
Living people
Star Magic
Star Music artists
TV5 (Philippine TV network) personalities
University of Asia and the Pacific alumni